The 2009 FIBA Europe Under-18 Championship was the 26th edition of the FIBA Europe Under-18 Championship. The competition was held in Metz and nearby Hagondange,  France, from July 23 to August 2 and featured 16 teams. Serbia won the title after beating France in the final.

Participating teams

Venues
Metz      Les Arènes                       (cap. : 4500)

Metz       Palais des sports Saint Symphorien               (cap. : 1800)

Hagondange       Salle Paul Lamm                      (cap. :1500)

Preliminary round
In this round, the sixteen teams were allocated in four groups of four teams each. The top three qualified for the Qualifying Round. The last team of each group played for the 13th–16th place in the classification games.

Group A

Group B

Group C

Group D

Qualifying round
The twelve teams remaining were allocated in two groups of six teams each. The four top teams advanced to the quarterfinals. The last two teams of each group played for the 9th–12th place.

Group E

Group F

Championship

Final standings

All Tournament Team

External links

FIBA U18 European Championship
2009–10 in European basketball
2009–10 in French basketball
International youth basketball competitions hosted by France